Oscar Hans (born 6 February 1910, date of death unknown) was a German war criminal, leader of a SS-Sonderkommando during the occupation of Norway. He was born in Volmeringen, Lorraine, German Empire.

Hans led the execution of more than 300 persons during the war years, including 195 persons executed at Trandumskogen in Ullensaker. His first job was the executions of Viggo Hansteen and Rolf Wickstrøm in September 1941, following a court-martial after the milk strike in Oslo. After the war he was initially sentenced to death, but he successfully appealed his sentence. The Supreme Court of Norway concluded that he could not have known he was acting in violation of certain treaties. The Supreme Court also expelled him from Norway, and he was later sentenced to 15 years imprisonment by a British court, for the execution of six British citizens. His trial by a British Military Court in Hamburg was held on 18–22 August 1948. He was released in April 1954.

References

Further reading 
 Nøkleby, Berit (1995): "Hans, Oscar". In: Hans Fredrik Dahl, Guri Hjeltnes, Berit Nøkleby, Nils Johan Ringdal and Øystein Sørensen, eds. Norsk krigsleksikon 1940–1945. Oslo: Cappelen. , p. 158 .
 Penn State International Law Review. Dickinson School of Law of the Pennsylvania State University, 2001, p. 209.

1910 births
Year of death missing
German executioners
SS-Hauptsturmführer
German people of World War II
People from Alsace-Lorraine
German prisoners sentenced to death
Prisoners sentenced to death by Norway
People deported from Norway
Prisoners and detainees of the British military
Nazis convicted of war crimes
Reich Security Main Office personnel